Hacıman (also, Hacman, Gadzhiman, and Gadzhyman) is a village in the Agsu Rayon of Azerbaijan.  The village forms part of the municipality of Dilman.

References 

Populated places in Agsu District